Christian Steen (born 2 July 1977) is a former Norwegian football player. He played as a centre back.

Steen started his career with Astor. He has played for Rosenborg BK, Bodø/Glimt, Aalesunds FK, and Tromsø IL. He joined Tromsø in January 2006. On 30 November 2007, after passing a physical test, he agreed terms with Molde FK. He retired after the 2011 season.

Career statistics

References

External links
  Player profile on official club website

1977 births
Living people
Norwegian footballers
Rosenborg BK players
FK Bodø/Glimt players
Aalesunds FK players
Tromsø IL players
Molde FK players
Eliteserien players
Norwegian First Division players
Footballers from Trondheim

Association football defenders